Lundey (Icelandic: , "Puffin Island") is a small, uninhabited island in Skagafjörður fjord located about  from the eastern mouth of the  Héraðsvötn River, in northern Iceland. It is one of three islands in the bay, the others being Málmey, and Drangey.
Its name in Icelandic means "Puffin"; And each summer, Atlantic Puffin breed on the island's cliffs hence its name. There are two other islands known as Lundey in Iceland; One in Skjálfandi Bay in northern Iceland and another near Reykjavík.

History
Though uninhabited, there is one standing structure on Lundey and viewed from above the island shows evidence of historically collapsed buildings.

Environment
Arctic Skua and Northern Fulmar, are common around Lundey during the Summer in addition to a nesting population of over 20,000 pairs of Atlantic Puffins. The sizable population makes up about 1% of Iceland's total puffin count and is considered an internationally important seabird settlement.

References

Islands of Iceland